The 1998 Acclaim Mosconi Cup, the fifth edition of the annual nine-ball pool competition between teams representing Europe and the United States, took place 17–20 December 1998 at the York Hall in Bethnal Green, London, England.

Team USA won the Mosconi Cup by defeating Team Europe 13–9.


Teams

Results

Thursday, 17 December

Session 1

Friday, 18 December

Session 2

Session 3

Saturday, 19 December

Session 4

Session 5

Sunday, 20 December

Session 6

Session 7

References

External links
 Official homepage

1998
1998 in cue sports
1998 sports events in London
Sport in the London Borough of Tower Hamlets
1998 in English sport
December 1998 sports events in the United Kingdom